is a Japanese koryū sword-fighting martial art founded in the late Muromachi period by Katayama Hōki-no-kami Fujiwara Hisayasu (片山伯耆守藤原久安) (1575–1650).

History
Although often stated to be a student of Hayashizaki Jinsuke (林崎甚助), the ryū itself states that Katayama Hisayasu inherited eighteen secret sword techniques from his uncle Katayama Shōan. Additionally Katayama Hisayasu was also said to have been the younger brother of Takenouchi Hisamori (竹内久盛）, founder of Takenouchi ryū （竹内流）. In 1596 he traveled to Atago Shrine in Kyoto and for seven days and seven nights trained and prayed continuously. In a divine dream, Hisayasu was supposedly given insight and was said to have attained enlightenment to the mysteries of the art of iai. Using this insight and the teachings received from his uncle he formed his own tradition of swordsmanship.

In 1610 he was called to the Royal Palace to demonstrate before the emperor. He demonstrated Iso-no-nami, one of the teachings he received from his uncle, in front of the Emperor Go-Yōzei. For this he was given the court rank ofJyu-Goi-Ge and made governor of Hōki province. In 1650, at the age of 76, Hisayasu died in Iwakuni, Yamaguchi Prefecture. The original name for Hisayasu's tradition was said to be Ikkan-ryū (一貫流) for a time, but was known within the Katayama family as Katayama-ryū (片山流）. Katayama Hisayasu's teaching also became widely spread in Kumamoto and the name Hōki-ryū (伯耆流) and Katayama Hōki-ryū (片山伯耆流) became more widely known there and throughout the country. The present day the tradition is generally referred to as just Hōki-ryū.
 
The art had been handed down in the Katayama family (in Iwakuni) and the Hoshino family (in Kumamoto), however the family of the last Katayama head was wiped out in World War II and that direct line, known as Katayama-ryū, is no longer extant. The Hoshino family in Kumamoto regularly maintained contact with the Katayama family and the majority of groups practicing Hōki-ryū today come from the Hoshino lineage. Today the Hōki-ryū tradition is today in its 12th or 13th generation.

Using Iso-no-nami as a base, Hisayasu and later generations of the Katayama and Hoshino families developed and established over seventy sword  forms although many of these have been lost in most groups practicing Hōki-ryū today. Presently, fifteen basic forms form the basis of nearly all Hōki-ryū groups, with different groups having varying numbers of the remaining kata surviving . These fifteen forms are divided to two sets; six forms in Omote and nine forms in Chudan. Most forms are started from the seiza posture.

Branches
Hōki-ryū has through history branched off and spawned derivatives. The majority of groups today come from the Hoshino family of Kumamoto. Today the art has large groups practicing in the Kyūshū, Hiroshima and Kansai areas, as well as smaller groups in other areas. Additional branches active today include Ono-ha Hōki-ryū and Kumagai-ha Hōki-ryū. Ono-ha Hōki-ryū was founded by Ono Kumao (himself of Hoshino lineage) and is today primarily practiced under the auspices of the All Japan Iaido Federation. Kumagai-ha Hōki-ryū is today only practiced in one dojo in northern Kumamoto Prefecture.

Iai forms

Omote (initial set)
Osae nuki. Thrust to an opponent to the left, with hand alongside the blade, in seiza posture.
Kote giri. Thrust to an opponent to the left, with hand alongside the blade, in seiza posture.
Kiri tsuke. Thrust to an opponent to the right, with hand alongside the blade, in seiza posture.
Nuki dome. Block an attack from right, and cut an opponent.
Tsuki dome. Deflect tsukidome, an attack from front, and cut an opponent.
Shiho kanakiri. Cut three opponents, in seiza posture.

Chu-dan (middle level)
Hiza zume. Nukitsuke to kesa and cut an opponent from front, in seiza posture.
Mune no katana. Strike aside the attack of an enemy, and cut, in seiza posture.
Okkake nuki. Nukitsuke to kesa and cut an opponent from front, in standing posture.
Kaeri nuki. Nukitsuke to kesa and cut an opponent from rear, in standing posture.
Issa soku. Jump-up and block ukenagashi from tate-hiza posture, and cut an opponent in the front standing and approaching.
Mukou zume. Block ukenagashi from standing posture, and cut an opponent in the front.
Naga rouka. Strike aside the attack of an enemy, and cut, from tate-hiza posture.
Kissaki gaeshi. Block ukenagashi, strike a face of an opponent in the front and thrust.
Shiho zume. Cut three opponents, in standing posture.

Notes

References
Katayama, Busuke (1892) Shinbu Shōtō Kinenhi, Iwakuni Chōkokan collection
Kayatama, Hisayuki (1756) Kenjutsu Mokurokujo, Iwakuni Chōkokan collection
Watatani, Kiyoshi (1971) Nihon Kengō 100 Sen (Tokyo: Akita Shoten) pp. 62–63
Watatani, Kiyoshi and Yamada, Tadachika (eds.) (1978) Bugei Ryūha Daijiten (Tokyo: Nihon Kopii Shuppanbu) pp. 186–188
Niwata, Yoshiho (1994) "Hōki-ryū Hoshino-ha Iaijutsu" in Miyazaki Miyu (ed.) Nihon Densho Bugei Ryūha: Dokuhon, (Tokyo: Shinjinbutsu Oraisha) pp. 134–135.

External links
 Hoki-ryu page at koryu.com
 Hoki-ryu history at Kimura Doujou in Kumamoto
 Hoki-ryu Iaido in Indiana
 European Hoki Ryu Federation
 Hoki Ryu Iaido under Kumai Kazuhiko Sensei
 Hoki Ryu Iaido in Rome, Italy
 Hoki Ryu Iaido in Ascoli Piceno, Italy
 Hoki Ryu Iaido in Bonn, Germany
 Hoki Ryu Iaido in Amsterdam, The Netherlands

Ko-ryū bujutsu
Japanese martial arts
Japanese swordsmanship